Protein HEXIM2 is a protein that in humans is encoded by the HEXIM2 gene.

References

Further reading